Galloping Galaxies! is a British children's television comedy series set on a spaceship that was shown on the BBC from 1 October 1985 to 18 December 1986, comprising two series, of ten episodes in total. It was created and written by Bob Block, the creator of Rentaghost. Jeremy Swan who directed Rentaghost, produced and directed the series. It featured Kenneth Williams in one of his final roles as the voice of the ship's bog-eyed computer, SID.
A novelisation of the first series was released by Target Books in 1987, and the second series was announced to follow in book form, but never materialised. No commercial release of the show has ever appeared.

Synopsis
The stories are set in the 25th century, and follow the adventures of the Spaceship Voyager, the computer SID, Captain Pettifer (Robert Swales) and his crew.

Cover blurb of novel: "GALLOPING GALAXIES! is the funniest thing this side of the moons of Saturn and will boldly make you laugh where you have never laughed before!"

External links

References

1985 British television series debuts
1986 British television series endings
BBC children's television shows
British children's comedy television series
1980s British children's television series
British children's science fiction television series
1980s British comic science fiction television series
1980s British comedy television series
British television shows featuring puppetry
Space adventure television series
Television series set in the 25th century